Brad Butt (born May 10, 1967) is a Canadian politician who was elected to the House of Commons of Canada in the 2011 election.

He represented the electoral district of Mississauga—Streetsville as a member of the Conservative Party until his defeat in the 2015 election. Before winning his seat in 2011, Butt had been a political commentator on Mississauga Cable 10 for many years, and president & CEO of the Greater Toronto Apartment Association since May 1999.

Early life
Butt is the son of the late Terry Butt, property developer and Ward 7 city councillor for Mississauga City Council.

Early Political Career
Butt first ran for public office in Mississauga Ward 7 city council in the 1988 municipal election and later in 1991 in Ward 1. Butt also ran for the Progressive Conservative Party of Ontario in the 1990 election in the provincial riding of Mississauga East.

Butt ran for the Canadian Alliance in the 2000 election in the federal riding of Mississauga South.

Member of Parliament
Butt provoked controversy in 2012 for making a 'finger gun' gesture at Liberal Leader Bob Rae, pretending to shoot him in the House of Commons.

On February 6, 2014, Butt claimed during a parliamentary debate about a proposed bill on election reform that he witnessed people taking discard voter cards from the garbage and then handing them to other people outside voting stations to be used as identification. On February 24, he retracted the statement and admitted that he had made up the story. He said, "I misspoke during debate and corrected the record." He said that what actually happened was that he was relating stories that he had heard during his time as president with the Greater Toronto Apartment Association. "I did not see it personally and only said it in the House, not committee. I made a mistake."

In the 2015 election, Butt was defeated by Liberal candidate Gagan Sikand. Butt made headlines during the election when he raised the example of Tom Mulcair, a dual citizen of Canada and France, as a hypothetical candidate for deportation if he was convicted of treason under the Conservatives' new citizenship bill, C-24.

Later political career

Butt registered to run as a candidate for Ward 1 city councillor for Mississauga City Council in the 2018 Peel Region municipal election, and has recently served as the director of government relations for the Mississauga Board of Trade. He was elected to city council in 2022.

References

External links

1967 births
Conservative Party of Canada MPs
Living people
Members of the House of Commons of Canada from Ontario
Politicians from Mississauga
Politicians from Ottawa
21st-century Canadian politicians
Mississauga city councillors